Donatien Alphonse François, Marquis de Sade (2 June 1740 – 2 December 1814), was a French nobleman, revolutionary politician, philosopher and writer famous for his literary depictions of a libertine sexuality as well as numerous accusations of sex crimes. His works include novels, short stories, plays, dialogues, and political tracts. In his lifetime some of these were published under his own name while others, which Sade denied having written, appeared anonymously. 

Sade is best known for his erotic works, which combined philosophical discourse with pornography, depicting sexual fantasies with an emphasis on violence, suffering, anal sex (which he calls sodomy), child rape, crime, and blasphemy against Christianity. Many of the characters in his works are teenagers or adolescents. His work is a depiction of extreme absolute freedom, unrestrained by morality, religion, or law. The words sadism and sadist are derived from his name in reference to the works of fiction he wrote, which portrayed numerous acts of sexual cruelty. While Sade explored a wide range of sexual deviations through his writings, his known behavior includes "only the beating of a housemaid and an orgy with several prostitutes—behavior significantly departing from the clinical definition of sadism". It is known that Sade forcibly held five adolescent girls and a teenage boy hostage in his chateau while forcing them to commit various sexual acts for six weeks in 1774. Sade was a proponent of free public brothels paid for by the state: In order both to prevent crimes in society that are motivated by lust and to reduce the desire to oppress others using one’s own power, Sade recommended public brothels where people can satisfy their wishes to command and be obeyed.

Despite having no legal charge brought against him, Sade was imprisoned or committed for about 32 years of his life, time divided between facilities such as the Château de Vincennes, the Bastille, and the Charenton asylum, where he died. He wrote many of his works during these periods of confinement. During the French Revolution, he was an elected delegate to the National Convention.

There continues to be a fascination with Sade among scholars and in popular culture. Prolific French intellectuals such as Roland Barthes, Jacques Derrida, and Michel Foucault published studies of him. In contrast, the French hedonist philosopher Michel Onfray has attacked this interest in Sade, writing that "It is intellectually bizarre to make Sade a hero." There have also been numerous film adaptations of his work, including Pasolini's Salò, an adaptation of Sade's controversial book The 120 Days of Sodom, as well as many of the films of Spanish director Jesús Franco.

Life

Early life and education

Sade was born on 2 June 1740, in the Hôtel de Condé, Paris, to Jean Baptiste François Joseph, Count de Sade and Marie Eléonore de Maillé de Carman, distant cousin and lady-in-waiting to the Princess of Condé. His parents' only surviving child, Sade and his family were soon abandoned by his father. He was raised by servants who indulged "his every whim", which led to his becoming "known as a rebellious and spoiled child with an ever-growing temper." After an incident in which he severely beat Louis Joseph, Prince of Condé, six-year-old Sade was sent to live under instruction of his maternal uncle, the Abbé de Sade, who "introduced him to debauchery". Shortly thereafter, his reportedly distant mother also abandoned him, joining a convent.

Later in his childhood, ten-year-old Sade was sent to the Lycée Louis-le-Grand in Paris, a Jesuit college, for four years. While at the school, he was tutored by Abbé Jacques-François Amblet, a priest. Later in life, at one of Sade's trials the Abbé testified, saying that Sade had a "passionate temperament which made him eager in the pursuit of pleasure" but had a "good heart." At the Lycée Louis-le-Grand, he was subjected to "severe corporal punishment," including flagellation, and he "spent the rest of his adult life obsessed with the violent act."

At age 14, Sade began attending an elite military academy. After twenty months of training, on 14 December 1755, at age 15, Sade was commissioned as a sub-lieutenant, becoming a soldier. After thirteen months as a sub-lieutenant, he was commissioned to the rank of cornet in the Brigade de S. André of the Comte de Provence's Carbine Regiment. He eventually became Colonel of a Dragoon regiment and fought in the Seven Years' War. In 1763, on returning from war, he courted a rich magistrate's daughter, but her father rejected his suitorship and instead arranged a marriage with his elder daughter, Renée-Pélagie de Montreuil; that marriage produced two sons and a daughter. In 1766, he had a private theatre built in his castle, the Château de Lacoste, in Provence. In January 1767, his father died.

Title and heirs
The men of the Sade family alternated between using the marquis and comte (count) titles. His grandfather, Gaspard François de Sade, was the first to use marquis; occasionally, he was the Marquis de Sade, but is identified in documents as the Marquis de Mazan. The Sade family were noblesse d'épée, claiming at the time the oldest, Frankish-descended nobility, so assuming a noble title without a King's grant was customarily de rigueur. Alternating title usage indicates that titular hierarchy (below duc et pair) was notional; theoretically, the marquis title was granted to noblemen owning several countships, but its use by men of dubious lineage caused its disrepute. At Court, precedence was by seniority and royal favor, not title. There is father-and-son correspondence, wherein father addresses son as marquis.

For many years, Sade's descendants regarded his life and work as a scandal to be suppressed. This did not change until the mid-20th century, when the Comte Xavier de Sade reclaimed the marquis title, long fallen into disuse, and took an interest in his ancestor's writings. At that time, the "divine marquis" of legend was so unmentionable in his own family that Xavier de Sade learned of him only in the late 1940s when approached by a journalist. He subsequently discovered a store of Sade's papers in the family château at Condé-en-Brie, and worked with scholars for decades to enable their publication. His youngest son, the Marquis Thibault de Sade, has continued the collaboration. The family have also claimed a trademark on the name. The family sold the Château de Condé in 1983. As well as the manuscripts they retain, others are held in universities and libraries. Many, however, were lost in the 18th and 19th centuries. A substantial number were destroyed after Sade's death at the instigation of his son, Donatien-Claude-Armand.

Scandals and imprisonment
Sade lived a scandalous libertine existence and repeatedly procured young prostitutes as well as employees of both sexes in his castle in Lacoste. He was also accused of blasphemy, which was considered a serious offense. His behavior also included an affair with his wife's sister, Anne-Prospère, who had come to live at the castle.

Beginning in 1763, Sade lived mainly in or near Paris. Four months following his marriage on 17 May 1763, Sade was charged with outrage to public morals, blasphemy and profanation of the image of Christ.  On 18 October 1763, Sade procured the services of a local prostitute named Jeanne Testard for sodomy, which was refused. He then locked her in his apartment room, before asking whether she believed in God. When she stated that she did, Sade proceeded to shout various obscenities and impieties concerning Jesus and the Virgin Mary, stating there was no god. Sade then masturbated into a church chalice, proceeding to stomp on an ivory crucifix while masturbating with another as he exclaimed blasphemies, before ordering her to beat him with a cane whip and an iron whip which had been heated by fire. During the twelve-hour ordeal, Sade forced Testard to stomp on a crucifix while repeating, "Bastard, I don't give a fuck about you!" under threat of a scabbard as he recited various blasphemous poems throughout the night. Following the incident, Testard then reported Sade to authorities, who arrested him on 29 October 1763, holding him for fifteen days in the prison of Vincennes. After several contrite letters in which Sade expressed remorse and begged to see a priest, the King ordered his release on 13 November. 

In September 1764, Sade returned to Paris, gradually developing a bad reputation which prompted the chief police inspector to advise to local madams that their prostitutes not accompany him to his countryside residence. Because of his sexual infamy, he was put under surveillance by the police, who made detailed reports of his activities over the course of the following years, writing in October 1767, "We will soon be hearing again of the horrors of the Comte de Sade."

On 3 April 1768, Easter Sunday, Sade had encountered a 36-year-old German widow named Rose Keller at the Place des Victoires; upon reassuring her that he required house service which included cleaning his bedroom, they rode in his carriage to Sade's country residence in Arcueil, where she was subsequently locked and held captive. Sade proceeded to bind Keller before proceeding to flagellate her with a whip over the course of two days. Although court documents suggest Sade may have made incisions on Keller's back, buttocks, and thighs before pouring hot wax into the wounds, Keller failed to produce evidence of her claims to authorities two days after the incident took place. On the day of her escape, Sade applied ointment to Keller as she cried and unbound her, ordering Keller to clean the bloodstains from her gown as he briefly departed. Through a window, Keller then fled before informing nearby locals and authorities, prompting Sade's arrest in June. He was briefly incarcerated in the then-prison Château de Saumur, and exiled to his château at Lacoste in 1768 as Keller was immediately bribed to drop charges.

On 27 June 1772, Sade procured four prostitutes with the aid of his manservant, Latour. During the ordeal, Sade whipped the prostitutes and requested they do the same. He then opted to engage in anal intercourse with the prostitutes, two of whom had refused, before engaging in mutual sodomy with his manservant. After the orgy, Sade offered them chocolates laced with an aphrodisiac in the hopes that the chocolate would allow him to fulfill his sexual fantasies with them. When the young women—suspicious of the chocolate's contents—grew pale and sick, they alerted authorities of the sodomy and perceived attempted poisoning and an investigation was opened. The two men were sentenced to death in absentia and charged with sodomy, attempted poisoning, and outrage to the country's morals. They fled to Italy, Sade taking his wife's sister—whom he had been in love with from the time she was 13—with him. With the help of Sade's mother-in-law, Sade and Latour were caught and imprisoned at the Fortress of Miolans in French Savoy in late 1772, but escaped four months later.

Sade later hid at Lacoste where he rejoined his wife, who became an accomplice in his subsequent endeavors. In the winter of 1774, Sade began to partake in orgies at his home in his wife's presence in which he enacted a series of theatrical sexual performances with five young females and a young manservant aged between 14 and 16 years old. By January 1775, the servants' parents began making complaints that Sade had abducted and seduced their children. When one of the female servants fled to his uncle's residence, Sade promptly urged him to hold her prisoner before making further efforts to suppress the scandal. Authorities learned of his sexual debauchery, however, and Sade was forced to flee to Italy once again following accusations of kidnapping and rape. It was during this time he wrote Voyage d'Italie. In 1776, he returned to Lacoste, again hired several women, most of whom soon fled. In 1777, the father of one of these employees went to Lacoste to claim his daughter, and attempted to shoot the Marquis at point-blank range, but the gun misfired.

Later that year, Sade was tricked into going to Paris to visit his supposedly ill mother, who in fact had recently died. He was arrested and imprisoned in the Château de Vincennes. He successfully appealed his death sentence in 1778 but remained imprisoned under the lettre de cachet. He escaped but was soon recaptured. He resumed writing and met fellow prisoner Comte de Mirabeau, who also wrote erotic works. Despite this common interest, the two came to dislike each other intensely.

In 1784, Vincennes was closed, and Sade was transferred to the Bastille. The following year, he wrote the manuscript for his magnum opus Les 120 Journées de Sodome (The 120 Days of Sodom), which he wrote in minuscule handwriting on a continuous roll of paper he rolled tightly and placed in his cell wall to hide. He was unable to finish the work; on 4 July 1789, he was transferred "naked as a worm" to the insane asylum at Charenton near Paris, two days after he reportedly incited unrest outside the prison by shouting to the crowds gathered there, "They are killing the prisoners here!" Sade was unable to retrieve the manuscript before being removed from the prison. The storming of the Bastille, a major event of the French Revolution, occurred ten days after Sade left, on 14 July. To his despair, he believed that the manuscript was destroyed in the storming of the Bastille, though it was actually saved by a man named Arnoux de Saint-Maximin two days before the Bastille was attacked. It is not known why Saint-Maximin chose to bring the manuscript to safety, nor indeed is anything else about him known.
In 1790, Sade was released from Charenton after the new National Constituent Assembly abolished the instrument of lettre de cachet. His wife obtained a divorce soon afterwards.

Return to freedom, delegate to the National Convention, and imprisonment
During Sade's time of freedom, beginning in 1790, he published several of his books anonymously. He met Marie-Constance Quesnet, a former actress with a six-year-old son, who had been abandoned by her husband. Constance and Sade stayed together for the rest of his life.

He initially adapted well to the new political order after the revolution, supported the Republic, called himself "Citizen Sade", and managed to obtain several official positions despite his aristocratic background.

Because of the damage done to his estate in Lacoste, which was sacked in 1789 by an angry mob, he moved to Paris. In 1790, he was elected to the National Convention, where he represented the far left. He was a member of the Piques section, notorious for its radical views. He wrote several political pamphlets, in which he called for the implementation of direct vote. However, there is much evidence suggesting that he suffered abuse from his fellow revolutionaries due to his aristocratic background. Matters were not helped by his son's May 1792 desertion from the military, where he had been serving as a second lieutenant and the aide-de-camp to an important colonel, the Marquis de Toulengeon. Sade was forced to disavow his son's desertion in order to save himself. Later that year, his name was added—whether by error or wilful malice—to the list of émigrés of the Bouches-du-Rhône department.

While claiming he was opposed to the Reign of Terror in 1793, he wrote an admiring eulogy for Jean-Paul Marat. At this stage, he was becoming publicly critical of Maximilien Robespierre and, on 5 December, he was removed from his posts, accused of moderatism, and imprisoned for almost a year. He was released in 1794 after the end of the Reign of Terror.

In 1796, now completely destitute, he had to sell his ruined castle in Lacoste.

Imprisonment for his writings and death

In 1801, Napoleon Bonaparte ordered the arrest of the anonymous author of Justine and Juliette, expressing outrage after he had been sent a copy of the latter novel by Sade. Sade was arrested at his publisher's office and imprisoned without trial; first in the Sainte-Pélagie Prison and, following allegations that he had tried to seduce young fellow prisoners there, in the harsh Bicêtre Asylum.

After intervention by his family, he was declared insane in 1803 and transferred once more to the Charenton Asylum. His ex-wife and children had agreed to pay his pension there. Constance, pretending to be his relative, was allowed to live with him at Charenton. The director of the institution, Abbé de Coulmier, allowed and encouraged him to stage several of his plays, with the inmates as actors, to be viewed by the Parisian public. Coulmier's novel approaches to psychotherapy attracted much opposition. In 1809, new police orders put Sade into solitary confinement and deprived him of pens and paper. In 1813, the government ordered Coulmier to suspend all theatrical performances.

Sade began a sexual relationship with 14-year-old Madeleine LeClerc, daughter of an employee at Charenton. This lasted some four years, until his death in 1814.

He had left instructions in his will forbidding that his body be opened for any reason whatsoever, and that it remain untouched for 48 hours in the chamber in which he died, and then placed in a coffin and buried on his property located in Malmaison near Épernon. These instructions were not followed; he was buried at Charenton. His skull was later removed from the grave for phrenological examination. His son had all his remaining unpublished manuscripts burned, including the immense multi-volume work Les Journées de Florbelle.

Appraisal and criticism

Numerous writers and artists, especially those concerned with sexuality, have been both repelled and fascinated by Sade. An article in The Independent, a British online newspaper, gives contrasting views: the French novelist Pierre Guyotat said, "Sade is, in a way, our Shakespeare. He has the same sense of tragedy, the same sweeping grandeur" while public intellectual Michel Onfray said, "it is intellectually bizarre to make Sade a hero... Even according to his most hero-worshipping biographers, this man was a sexual delinquent".

The contemporary rival pornographer Rétif de la Bretonne published an Anti-Justine in 1798.

Geoffrey Gorer, an English anthropologist and author (1905–1985), wrote one of the earliest books on Sade, entitled The Revolutionary Ideas of the Marquis de Sade in 1935. He pointed out that Sade was in complete opposition to contemporary philosophers for both his "complete and continual denial of the right to property" and for viewing the struggle in late 18th century French society as being not between "the Crown, the bourgeoisie, the aristocracy or the clergy, or sectional interests of any of these against one another", but rather all of these "more or less united against the proletariat." By holding these views, he cut himself off entirely from the revolutionary thinkers of his time to join those of the mid-nineteenth century. Thus, Gorer argued, "he can with some justice be called the first reasoned socialist."

Simone de Beauvoir (in her essay Must we burn Sade?, published in Les Temps modernes, December 1951 and January 1952) and other writers have attempted to locate traces of a radical philosophy of freedom in Sade's writings, preceding modern existentialism by some 150 years. He has also been seen as a precursor of Sigmund Freud's psychoanalysis in his focus on sexuality as a motive force. The surrealists admired him as one of their forerunners, and Guillaume Apollinaire famously called him "the freest spirit that has yet existed".

Pierre Klossowski, in his 1947 book Sade Mon Prochain ("Sade My Neighbour"), analyzes Sade's philosophy as a precursor of nihilism, negating Christian values and the materialism of the Enlightenment.

One of the essays in Max Horkheimer and Theodor Adorno's Dialectic of Enlightenment (1947) is titled "Juliette, or Enlightenment and Morality" and interprets the ruthless and calculating behavior of Juliette as the embodiment of the philosophy of Enlightenment. Similarly, psychoanalyst Jacques Lacan posited in his 1963 essay Kant avec Sade that Sade's ethics was the complementary completion of the categorical imperative originally formulated by Immanuel Kant.

In contrast, G. T. Roche argued that Sade, contrary to what some have claimed, did indeed express or discuss specific philosophical views in his work. He concludes most were views current in the Enlightenment period (some of them responding to others', such as Jean-Jacques Rousseau's). Yet others he finds to also be prescient of later philosophers, for instance Friedrich Nietzsche, in certain ways. Roche criticizes and discusses some of these views in detail. He criticizes Theodor Adorno and Max Horkheimer's view that Sade was a quintessential Enlightenment thinker whose ideas had been born out negatively later in their work Dialectic of Enlightenment. Additionally, he criticizes the idea Sade showed morality cannot have a rational basis, and acting morally is no more justified than being immoral.

In his 1988 Political Theory and Modernity, William E. Connolly analyzes Sade's Philosophy in the Bedroom as an argument against earlier political philosophers, notably Jean-Jacques Rousseau and Thomas Hobbes, and their attempts to reconcile nature, reason, and virtue as bases of ordered society. Similarly, Camille Paglia argued that Sade can be best understood as a satirist, responding "point by point" to Rousseau's claims that society inhibits and corrupts mankind's innate goodness: Paglia notes that Sade wrote in the aftermath of the French Revolution, when Rousseauist Jacobins instituted the bloody Reign of Terror and Rousseau's predictions were brutally disproved. "Simply follow nature, Rousseau declares. Sade, laughing grimly, agrees."

In The Sadeian Woman: And the Ideology of Pornography (1979), Angela Carter provides a feminist reading of Sade, seeing him as a "moral pornographer" who creates spaces for women. Similarly, Susan Sontag defended both Sade and Georges Bataille's Histoire de l'œil (Story of the Eye) in her essay "The Pornographic Imagination" (1967) on the basis their works were transgressive texts, and argued that neither should be censored. By contrast, Andrea Dworkin saw Sade as the exemplary woman-hating pornographer, supporting her theory that pornography inevitably leads to violence against women. One chapter of her book Pornography: Men Possessing Women (1979) is devoted to an analysis of Sade. Susie Bright claims that Dworkin's first novel Ice and Fire, which is rife with violence and abuse, can be seen as a modern retelling of Sade's Juliette.

Influence

Sexual sadism disorder, a mental condition named after Sade, has been defined as experiencing sexual arousal in response to extreme pain, suffering or humiliation done non-consensually to others (as described by Sade in his novels). Other terms have been used to describe the condition, which may overlap with other sexual preferences that also involve inflicting pain.  It is distinct from situations where consenting individuals use mild or simulated pain or humiliation for sexual excitement.

Various influential cultural figures have expressed a great interest in Sade's work, including the French philosopher Michel Foucault, the American film maker John Waters and the Spanish filmmaker Jesús Franco. The poet Algernon Charles Swinburne is also said to have been highly influenced by Sade. Nikos Nikolaidis' 1979 film The Wretches Are Still Singing was shot in a surreal way with a predilection for the aesthetics of the Marquis de Sade; Sade is said to have influenced Romantic and Decadent authors such as Charles Baudelaire, Gustave Flaubert, and Rachilde; and to have influenced a growing popularity of nihilism in Western thought. The philosopher of egoist anarchism, Max Stirner, is also speculated to have been influenced by Sade's work.

Serial killer Ian Brady, who with Myra Hindley carried out torture and murder of children known as the Moors murders in England during the 1960s, was fascinated by Sade, and the suggestion was made at their trial and appeals that the tortures of the children (the screams and pleadings of whom they tape-recorded) were influenced by Sade's ideas and fantasies. According to Donald Thomas, who has written a biography on Sade, Brady and Hindley had read very little of Sade's actual work; the only book of his they possessed was an anthology of excerpts that included none of his most extreme writings. In the two suitcases found by the police that contained books that belonged to Brady was The Life and Ideas of the Marquis de Sade. Hindley herself claimed that Brady would send her to obtain books by Sade, and that after reading them he became sexually aroused and beat her.

In Philosophy in the Bedroom Sade proposed the use of induced abortion for social reasons and population control, marking the first time the subject had been discussed in public. It has been suggested that Sade's writing influenced the subsequent medical and social acceptance of abortion in Western society.

Cultural depictions

There have been many and varied references to the Marquis de Sade in popular culture, including fictional works and biographies. The eponym of the psychological and subcultural term sadism, his name is used variously to evoke sexual violence, licentiousness, and freedom of speech. In modern culture his works are simultaneously viewed as masterful analyses of how power and economics work, and as erotica. It could be argued that Sade's sexually explicit works were a medium for the articulation but also for the exposure of the corrupt and hypocritical values of the elite in his society, and that it was primarily this inconvenient and embarrassing satire that led to his long-term detention. With this view, he becomes a symbol of the artist's struggle with the censor and that of the moral philosopher with the constraints of conventional morality.  Sade's use of pornographic devices to create provocative works that subvert the prevailing moral values of his time inspired many other artists in a variety of media. The cruelties depicted in his works gave rise to the concept of sadism. Sade's works have to this day been kept alive by certain artists and intellectuals because they themselves espouse a philosophy of extreme individualism. But Sade's life was lived in flat contradiction and breach of Kant's injunction to treat others as ends in themselves and never merely as means to an agent's own ends.

In the late 20th century, there was a resurgence of interest in Sade; leading French intellectuals like Roland Barthes, Jacques Lacan, Jacques Derrida, and Michel Foucault to publish studies of the philosopher, and interest in Sade among scholars and artists continued. In the realm of visual arts, many surrealist artists had an interest in the "Divine Marquis." Sade was celebrated in surrealist periodicals, and feted by figures such as Guillaume Apollinaire, Paul Éluard, and Maurice Heine; Man Ray admired Sade because he and other surrealists viewed him as an ideal of freedom. The first Manifesto of Surrealism (1924) announced that "Sade is surrealist in sadism", and extracts of the original draft of Justine were published in Le Surréalisme au service de la révolution. In literature, Sade is referenced in several stories by horror and science fiction writer (and author of Psycho) Robert Bloch, while Polish science fiction author Stanisław Lem wrote an essay analyzing the game theory arguments appearing in Sade's Justine. The writer Georges Bataille applied Sade's methods of writing about sexual transgression to shock and provoke readers.

Sade's life and works have been the subject of numerous fictional plays, films, pornographic or erotic drawings, etchings, and more.
These include Peter Weiss's play Marat/Sade, a fantasia extrapolating from the fact that Sade directed plays performed by his fellow inmates at the Charenton asylum. Yukio Mishima, Barry Yzereef, and Doug Wright also wrote plays about Sade; Weiss's and Wright's plays have been made into films. His work is referenced on film at least as early as
Luis Buñuel's L'Âge d'Or (1930), the final segment of which provides a coda to 120 Days of Sodom, with the four debauched noblemen emerging from their mountain retreat. In 1969, American International Films released a German-made production called de Sade, with Keir Dullea in the title role. Pier Paolo Pasolini filmed Salò, or the 120 Days of Sodom (1975),
updating Sade's novel to the brief Salò Republic; in 1989, Henri Xhonneux and Roland Topor made Marquis, which was partially based on the memoirs of de Sade; Benoît Jacquot's Sade and Philip Kaufman's Quills (from the play of the same name by Doug Wright) both hit cinemas in 2000. Quills, inspired by Sade's imprisonment and battles with the censorship in his society, portrays him (Geoffrey Rush) as a literary freedom fighter who is a martyr to the cause of free expression. Sade is a 2000 French film directed by Benoît Jacquot starring Daniel Auteuil as the Marquis de Sade, which was adapted by Jacques Fieschi and Bernard Minoret from the novel La terreur dans le boudoir by Serge Bramly.

Often Sade himself has been depicted in American popular culture less as a revolutionary or even as a libertine and more akin to a sadistic, tyrannical villain. For example, in the final episode of the television series Friday the 13th: The Series, Micki, the female protagonist, travels back in time and ends up being imprisoned and tortured by Sade. Similarly, in the horror film Waxwork, Sade is among the film's wax villains to come alive.

While not personally depicted, Sade's writings feature prominently in the novel Too Like the Lightning, first book in the Terra Ignota sequence written by Ada Palmer. Palmer's depiction of 25th-century Earth relies heavily on the philosophies and prominent figureheads of the Enlightenment, such as Voltaire and Denis Diderot in addition to Sade, and in the book the narrator Mycroft, after showing his fictional "reader" a sex scene formulated off of Sade's own, takes this imaginary reader's indignation as an opportunity to delve into Sade's ideas. Additionally, one of the central locations in the novel, a brothel advertising itself as a "bubble of the 18th century", features an inscription over the proprietor's door dedicating the establishment as a temple to Sade, an homage to Voltaire's "Le Temple du goût, par M. de Voltaire."

Writing

Literary criticism
The Marquis de Sade viewed Gothic fiction as a genre that relied heavily on magic and phantasmagoria. In his literary criticism Sade sought to prevent his fiction from being labeled "Gothic" by emphasizing Gothic's supernatural aspects as the fundamental difference from themes in his own work. But while he sought this separation he believed the Gothic played a necessary role in society and discussed its roots and its uses. He wrote that the Gothic novel was a perfectly natural, predictable consequence of the revolutionary sentiments in Europe. He theorized that the adversity of the period had rightfully caused Gothic writers to "look to hell for help in composing their alluring novels." Sade held the work of writers Matthew Lewis and Ann Radcliffe high above other Gothic authors, praising the brilliant imagination of Radcliffe and pointing to Lewis' The Monk as without question the genre's best achievement. Sade nevertheless believed that the genre was at odds with itself, arguing that the supernatural elements within Gothic fiction created an inescapable dilemma for both its author and its readers. He argued that an author in this genre was forced to choose between elaborate explanations of the supernatural or no explanation at all and that in either case the reader was unavoidably rendered incredulous. Despite his celebration of The Monk, Sade believed that there was not a single Gothic novel that had been able to overcome these problems, and that a Gothic novel that did would be universally regarded for its excellence in fiction.

Many assume that Sade's criticism of the Gothic novel is a reflection of his frustration with sweeping interpretations of works like Justine. Within his objections to the lack of verisimilitude in the Gothic may have been an attempt to present his own work as the better representation of the whole nature of man. Since Sade professed that the ultimate goal of an author should be to deliver an accurate portrayal of man, it is believed that Sade's attempts to separate himself from the Gothic novel highlights this conviction. For Sade, his work was best suited for the accomplishment of this goal in part because he was not chained down by the supernatural silliness that dominated late 18th-century fiction. Moreover, it is believed that Sade praised The Monk (which displays Ambrosio's sacrifice of his humanity to his unrelenting sexual appetite) as the best Gothic novel chiefly because its themes were the closest to those within his own work.

Libertine novels
Sade's fiction has been classified under different genres, including pornography, Gothic, and baroque. Sade's most famous books are often classified not as Gothic but as libertine novels, and include the novels Justine, or the Misfortunes of Virtue; Juliette; The 120 Days of Sodom; and Philosophy in the Bedroom. These works challenge traditional perceptions of sexuality, religion, law, age, and gender. His fictional portrayals of sexual violence and sadism stunned even those contemporaries of Sade who were quite familiar with the dark themes of the Gothic novel during its popularity in the late 18th century. Suffering is the primary rule, as in these novels one must often decide between sympathizing with the torturer or the victim. While these works focus on the dark side of human nature, the magic and phantasmagoria that dominates the Gothic is noticeably absent and is the primary reason these works are not considered to fit the genre.

Through the unreleased passions of his libertines, Sade wished to shake the world at its core. With 120 Days, for example, Sade wished to present "the most impure tale that has ever been written since the world exists." Despite his literary attempts at evil, his characters and stories often fell into repetition of sexual acts and philosophical justifications. Simone de Beauvoir and Georges Bataille have argued that the repetitive form of his libertine novels, though hindering the artfulness of his prose, ultimately strengthened his individualist arguments. The repetitive and obsessive nature of the account of Justine's abuse and frustration in her strivings to be a good Christian living a virtuous and pure life may on a superficial reading seem tediously excessive. Paradoxically, however, Sade checks the reader's instinct to treat them as laughable cheap pornography and obscenity by knowingly and artfully interweaving the tale of her trials with extended reflections on individual and social morality.

Short fiction
In The Crimes of Love, subtitled "Heroic and Tragic Tales", Sade combines romance and horror, employing several Gothic tropes for dramatic purposes. There is blood, banditti, corpses, and of course insatiable lust. Compared to works like Justine, here Sade is relatively tame, as overt eroticism and torture is subtracted for a more psychological approach. It is the impact of sadism instead of acts of sadism itself that emerge in this work, unlike the aggressive and rapacious approach in his libertine works. The modern volume entitled Gothic Tales collects a variety of other short works of fiction intended to be included in Sade's Contes et Fabliaux d'un Troubadour Provençal du XVIII Siecle.

An example is "Eugénie de Franval", a tale of incest and retribution. In its portrayal of conventional moralities it is something of a departure from the erotic cruelties and moral ironies that dominate his libertine works. It opens with a domesticated approach:

To enlighten mankind and improve its morals is the only lesson which we offer in this story. In reading it, may the world discover how great is the peril which follows the footsteps of those who will stop at nothing to satisfy their desires.

Descriptions in Justine seem to anticipate Radcliffe's scenery in The Mysteries of Udolpho and the vaults in The Italian, but, unlike these stories, there is no escape for Sade's virtuous heroine, Justine. Unlike the milder Gothic fiction of Radcliffe, Sade's protagonist is brutalized throughout and dies tragically. To have a character like Justine, who is stripped without ceremony and bound to a wheel for fondling and thrashing, would be unthinkable in the domestic Gothic fiction written for the bourgeoisie. Sade even contrives a kind of affection between Justine and her tormentors, suggesting shades of masochism in his heroine.

Legacy

The castle of the Marquis in Lubéron was purchased and partially restored by Pierre Cardin, including commissioning a surrealist bronze art work by Alexander Bourganov as a memorial. In the late 1940s at another de Sade family property, the Château de Condé, descendants discovered a cache of the Marquis's papers behind a bricked-up wall in the attic: they had been hidden by earlier ashamed members of the family. This chateau was sold by the family in 1983; however some personal items from the discovery continue to be owned by family members. A descendant, Hugues, Comte de Sade sells bronze replicas of the Marquis's skull.

Bibliography

See also

 BDSM
 Fetish fashion
 Leopold von Sacher-Masoch
 Sexual fetishism
 Jesús Franco directed films based on the Marquis de Sade's works

References

Notes

Further reading

 Sade's Sensibilities. (2014) edited by Kate Parker and Norbert Sclippa (A collection of essays reflecting on Sade's influence on his bicentennial anniversary.)
 Forbidden Knowledge: From Prometheus to Pornography. (1994) by Roger Shattuck (Provides a sound philosophical introduction to Sade and his writings.)
 Pour Sade. (2006) by Norbert Sclippa
 Marquis de Sade: his life and works. (1899) by Iwan Bloch
 Sade Mon Prochain. (1947) by Pierre Klossowski
 Lautréamont and Sade. (1949) by Maurice Blanchot
 The Marquis de Sade, a biography. (1961) by Gilbert Lély
 Philosopher of Evil: The Life and Works of the Marquis de Sade. (1962) by Walter Drummond
 The Life and Ideas of the Marquis de Sade. (1963) by Geoffrey Gorer
 Sade, Fourier, Loyola. (1971) by Roland Barthes
  De Sade: A Critical Biography. (1978) by Ronald Hayman
 The Sadeian Woman: An Exercise in Cultural History. (1979) by Angela Carter
 The Marquis de Sade: the man, his works, and his critics: an annotated bibliography. (1986) by Colette Verger Michael
 Sade, his ethics and rhetoric. (1989) collection of essays, edited by Colette Verger Michael
 Marquis de Sade: A Biography. (1991) by Maurice Lever
 The philosophy of the Marquis de Sade. (1995) by Timo Airaksinen
 Dark Eros: The Imagination of Sadism. (1996) by Thomas Moore (spiritual writer)
 Sade contre l'Être suprême. (1996) by Philippe Sollers
 A Fall from Grace (1998) by Chris Barron
 Sade: A Biographical Essay (1998) by Laurence Louis Bongie
 An Erotic Beyond: Sade. (1998) by Octavio Paz
 The Marquis de Sade: a life. (1999) by Neil Schaeffer
 At Home With the Marquis de Sade: A Life. (1999) by Francine du Plessix Gray
 Sade: A Sudden Abyss. (2001) by Annie Le Brun
 Sade: from materialism to pornography. (2002) by Caroline Warman
 Marquis de Sade: the genius of passion. (2003) by Ronald Hayman
 Marquis de Sade: A Very Short Introduction (2005) by John Phillips
 The Dangerous Memoir of Citizen Sade (2000) by A. C. H. Smith (A biographical novel)
 Outsider Biographies; Savage, de Sade, Wainewright, Ned Kelly, Billy the Kid, Rimbaud and Genet: Base Crime and High Art in Biography and Bio-Fiction, 1744–2000 (2014) by Ian H. Magedera

External links

 
 
 
 Norbert Sclippa
 Œuvres du Marquis de Sade
 
 
 Biography at Trivia Library
 Carnet du Marquis de Sade Site run by a descendant of the Marquis de Sade. Weekly publication of the article(s) around the current de Sade.
 Crime Library: The Marquis de Sade
 

 
1740 births
1814 deaths
18th-century French criminals
18th-century French novelists
18th-century French writers
18th-century French male writers
18th-century French philosophers
19th-century French criminals
19th-century French novelists
19th-century French philosophers
19th-century French short story writers
18th-century French dramatists and playwrights
19th-century French dramatists and playwrights
Anti-monarchists
Atheist philosophers
BDSM writers
Civil disobedience
Critics of Christianity
Deputies to the French National Convention
Far-left politics in France
French erotica writers
French marquesses
French military personnel of the Seven Years' War
French prisoners and detainees
French republicans
French revolutionaries
Free speech activists
Lycée Louis-le-Grand alumni
Individualists
Materialists
Nihilists
Obscenity controversies in literature
People convicted of sodomy
People imprisoned by lettre de cachet
People of the French Revolution
People sentenced to death in absentia
Philosophers of nihilism
Philosophers of sexuality
Prisoners of the Bastille
Sex scandals
Writers from Paris